Ladislav Gáspár (born July 4, 1970) is a former Slovak para table tennis player.

References

1970 births
Table tennis players at the 1996 Summer Paralympics
Table tennis players at the 2000 Summer Paralympics
Table tennis players at the 2004 Summer Paralympics
Table tennis players at the 2008 Summer Paralympics
Medalists at the 1996 Summer Paralympics
Medalists at the 2000 Summer Paralympics
Medalists at the 2004 Summer Paralympics
Living people
Paralympic medalists in table tennis
Paralympic gold medalists for Slovakia
Paralympic silver medalists for Slovakia
Paralympic bronze medalists for Slovakia
Paralympic table tennis players of Slovakia
Slovak male table tennis players